Brian Shaw (1931 – 13 February 2011) was an English World Cup winning professional rugby league footballer who played in the 1950s and 1960s.

Background
Brian Shaw's birth was registered in Leeds South district, West Riding of Yorkshire, England, and he died aged 79 in Leeds, West Yorkshire, England.

Playing career

International honours
Brian Shaw won caps for Great Britain while at Hunslet in 1956 against Australia (2 matches), in 1960 against France, Australia, France, and in 1961 against France.

Brian Shaw played , in last two of Great Britain's three 1960 Rugby League World Cup matches, including Great Britain's 10-3 victory over Australia to win the 1960 Rugby League World Cup at Odsal Stadium, Bradford on Tuesday 8 November 1960.

Brian Shaw played  for Rugby League XIII while at Hunslet in the 8-26 defeat by France on Saturday 22 November 1958 at Knowsley Road, St. Helens.

Championship final appearances
Brian Shaw played in Hunslet's 22-44 defeat by St. Helens in the Championship Final during the 1958–59 season at Odsal Stadium, Bradford on Saturday 16 May 1959, and played  in Leeds' 25-10 victory over Warrington in the Championship Final during the 1960–61 season at Odsal Stadium, Bradford on Saturday 20 May 1961.

Club career
Brian Shaw was a pupil in the Hunslet Schools system, and signed as a professional for Hunslet from Old Lane Youth Club in Beeston for £250. He was transferred from Hunslet to Leeds during January 1961 for a world record transfer fee of £13,250, in a cash plus player deal, the players being Bernard Prior and Norman Burton (based on increases in average earnings, this would be approximately £583,000 in 2013).

References

External links
!Great Britain Statistics at englandrl.co.uk (statistics currently missing due to not having appeared for both Great Britain, and England)

1931 births
2011 deaths
English rugby league players
Great Britain national rugby league team players
Hunslet F.C. (1883) players
Leeds Rhinos players
People from Beeston, Leeds
People from Hunslet
Rugby league players from Leeds
Rugby league locks
Rugby league props
Rugby league second-rows
Rugby League XIII players
Yorkshire rugby league team players